Ben Cotton (born July 26, 1975) is a Canadian film and television actor. His most notable roles are on the TV series Stargate Atlantis playing scientist Dr. Kavanagh, his portrayal of "Leon Bell" in the game Dead Rising 2, Shane Pierce, the local townie, on CBS's Harper's Island and Lt. Coker Fasjovik in Battlestar Galactica: Blood and Chrome.

Selected filmography
Smallville (2002) as Paul
Stargate Atlantis (2004-2009) as Dr. Kavanagh
The 4400: Episode 2x05 Suffer The Children (2005) as Dewey
The Cabin Movie (2005)
A Simple Curve (2005)
Heartfelt Café (2006) as Romantic Boy
Family in Hiding (2006) as Travis
Slither (2006) as Charlie
Whistler (2007) as Dean Webber
Supernatural (2007) as Businessman/Pride
Blood Ties: 2x08 The Good, The Bad and The Ugly (2007) as Kelly
Flash Gordon : 1x14 Stand and Deliver (2007) as Bounty Hunter
Battlestar Galactica: Razor (2007) as Terrified Man
The Day the Earth Stood Still (2008) as Trucker
Robson Arms (2008) as Joel
jPod (2008) as Tim
Messages Deleted (2009) as Sarge
Christmas in Canaan (2009) as Buddy
Riese the Series (2009) as Herrick
Harper's Island (2009) as Shane Pierce
Hellcats (2010) as Travis Guthrie
30 Days of Night: Dark Days (2010) as Dane
The Boy Who Cried Werewolf (2010) as Cab Driver
Doppelgänger Paul (2011)
Arrow (2012) as Dave Hackett
Alcatraz (2012) as Inmate
Battlestar Galactica: Blood & Chrome (2012) as Coker Fasjovik
Love at the Thanksgiving Day Parade (2012) as Brian 
Fringe (2012) as Impound Clerk
Once Upon a Time in Wonderland (2013-2014) as Tweedle #2
Cinemanovels (2013) as Ben
Lawrence & Holloman (2013) as Lawrence
Songs She Wrote About People She Knows (2014) as Jason 
Kid Cannabis (2014) as Joe Loya
iZombie (TV series) (2015) as Blaine's henchman
 The Unseen (2016) as Crisby
 Mars (2016) as Captain Ben Sawyer 
 Gregoire (2017) as Steve
 Crown and Anchor (2018)
 Limetown (2019) as Terry Hilkins
 Cold Pursuit (2019) as Windex
 An Awkward Balance (2020) as Mike
Resident Alien (2021) as Jimmy
Debris (2021) as Loeb

References

External links

1975 births
Canadian male film actors
Canadian male television actors
Canadian male voice actors
Living people
Male actors from Edmonton